Kgotso Pieter David (K.P.D.) Maphalla (born 1955, South Africa – died 5 April 2021, South Africa) was a writer in the Sesotho language. An author of more than 40 books, Maphalla has received an honorary doctorate from the University of the Free State, as well as a Lifetime Achievement Award in Literature. Maphalla died on 5 April 2021 after suffering a stroke. He was laid to rest in Bohlokong, near Bethlehem on 14 April 2021.

Amongst his many books (not to mention radio plays,) are the following: Tahleho (drama); Tshiu tseo (novel); Kabelwamanong (detective novel); Botsang lebitla (novel); Tsie lala (poetry); Mahohodi (poetry); Dikano (poetry); Pinyane (poetry); Ditema (poetry); Fuba sa ka (poetry); Kgapha tsa ka (poetry); Seitebatso (poetry); Sentebale (poetry); A tale of two fathers (English novel); Mohlomong Hosane (essays/short stories); Bashemane ba Dibataolong (novel).

References

External links
https://web.archive.org/web/20150219123102/http://www.sala.org.za/Profile.aspx?RecipientID=12
"KPD Maphalla - a superb Sesotho Writer", Black African Literature, 6 September 2009.
https://www.news24.com/news24/southafrica/news/acclaimed-sesotho-author-dr-kgotso-maphalla-dies-aged-66-20210406

Living people
1955 births